Philodendron mamei is a species of plant in the genus Philodendron native to Ecuador. First collected by Europeans in 1882, it has long been cultivated as a houseplant. P. mamei is a terrestrial species with a creeping growth habit and prostrate stems, and it is noted for its matte dark green leaves with gray-green spots and cordate shape. 

It has also been introduced as an invasive species to the Cook Islands and Society Islands.

References

mamei
Flora of Ecuador
Plants described in 1883